The 1967 Los Angeles Rams season was the team's 30th year with the National Football League and the 22nd season in Los Angeles. Under second-year head coach George Allen, the Rams had a regular season record of 11–1–2, tied for the best in the league (and the best of the George Allen era), and won the Coastal Division title. It was their first playoff appearance since 1955.

Offseason

NFL draft

Roster

Regular season
The Los Angeles Rams entered the 1967 season with renewed optimism. For years they had been a poor team, but the hiring of coach George Allen helped turn things around. In his first season in 1966, the Rams finished at 8–6, their first winning season since 1958.

The Rams won their first two games and faced a big test in Dallas on October 1 against the powerful Cowboys, the defending Eastern Conference champions. It was no contest at the sold-out Cotton Bowl, as the Rams won 35–13, but they came home and stumbled in a 27–24 loss to the 49ers and fell a game behind the 4–0 Baltimore Colts. Los Angeles went east to Baltimore and played to a 24–24 tie. Remarkably, both teams tied their next game as well; the Rams tied the Washington Redskins while the Colts tied the Minnesota Vikings. Both teams then went on winning streaks, and with two games remaining, the Rams were 9–1–2 and the Colts were 10–0–2.

But before finishing the season against the Colts in L.A. in a possible division title deciding game, the Rams faced the two-time defending champion Green Bay Packers (9–2–1). The Packers had clinched their division and would host its playoff games, so a reporter had asked Green Bay head coach Vince Lombardi if he would be resting his starters in (what for them was) a meaningless game, Lombardi roared, "the Packers have never played a meaningless game and, as long as I am the coach, they never will!"  The game was a classic see-saw affair that saw the Packers leading 24–20 with less than a minute to play and the Rams out of time outs. Facing fourth down, the Packers lined up to punt, but Tony Guillory blocked the Donny Anderson punt and Claude Crabb returned it to the Packer 5-yard line. On second and goal, quarterback Roman Gabriel hit flanker Bernie Casey in the end zone for a 27–24 Rams victory.

In the season finale on December 17, the Rams sacked Baltimore quarterback Johnny Unitas seven times and intercepted two of his passes in a 34–10 win. Both teams finished 11–1–2 and tiebreaker rules at the time dictated that the results of the teams' head to head meetings was the tiebreaker. The Rams were awarded the division title based on their 1–0–1 record vs. the Colts, outscoring them in the two games by a combined 58–34.

Schedule

Standings

Postseason

In 1967, the hosts were the Capitol and Central division winners for the conference championships (first round), and the Western Conference for the championship game. This gave home field advantage to the Central Division winner, the two-time defending NFL champion Green Bay Packers. The following year's playoff hosts were Century, Coastal, and Eastern, respectively, and 1969 was like 1967. With the rotation system it was common for the host team to have an inferior record; it had occurred in four of the previous five NFL championship games (1962, 1964, 1965, 1966).

The Coastal division champion Rams (11–1–2) traveled to Milwaukee to meet the Central champion Packers (9–4–1) for the Western Conference title on Saturday, December 23. It was played at County Stadium (the Packers played several home games per season in Milwaukee through 1994) The two teams had played a classic game just thirteen days earlier in Los Angeles (won by the Rams in the final seconds).

In the playoff game, the Rams jumped out to a 7–0 lead in the unusually balmy  weather, but the Packers' postseason experience began to show as they led 14–7 at halftime. The Rams could not get anything going offensively and the Packers went on to a methodical 28–7 win. The following week, the Packers won the famed "Ice Bowl" game against the Dallas Cowboys at Lambeau Field in Green Bay.

After the loss in Milwaukee, Los Angeles played the Cleveland Browns in the third place Playoff Bowl. Held at the Orange Bowl in Miami on January 7, it was won by the Rams 30–6.

References

External links
(VIDEO) 1967 Los Angeles Rams yearbook: NFL Films on YouTube

Los Angeles Rams
Los Angeles Rams seasons
Los Angeles Rams